Francisco Coronel (born 7 August 1942) is a former Mexican cyclist. He competed in the individual road race at the 1964 Summer Olympics.

References

External links
 

1942 births
Living people
Mexican male cyclists
Olympic cyclists of Mexico
Cyclists at the 1964 Summer Olympics
Place of birth missing (living people)